This list of newspapers in Canada is a list of newspapers printed and distributed in Canada.

Daily newspapers

Local weeklies

Alberta

 Bashaw – Bashaw Star
 Bassano – Bassano Times
 Beaumont – Beaumont News
 Beaverlodge – Beaverlodge Advertiser
 Bow Island – Bow Island Commentator
 Bowden – The Voice of Bowden
 Brooks – Brooks & County Chronicle, Brooks Bulletin
 Calmar – Calmar Community Voice
 Camrose – Camrose Booster
 Canmore – Rocky Mountain Outlook
 Cardston – The Star
 Carstairs – Carstairs Courier
 Castor – Castor Advance
 Chestermere – Chestermere Anchor
 Claresholm – Claresholm Local Press
 Coaldale – Coaldale Sunny South News
 Cochrane – Cochrane Times, Cochrane Eagle
 Cold Lake – Cold Lake Courier
 Consort – Consort Enterprise
 Coronation – Coronation Review
 Crossfield/Irricana – Five Village Weekly
 Crowsnest Pass – Crowsnest Pass Herald
 Devon – Devon Dispatch News
 Didsbury – Didsbury Review
 Drumheller – Drumheller Mail, inSide Drumheller
 Eckville – Eckville Echo
 Edson – Weekly Anchor
 Fairview – Fairview Post
 Falher – Smoky River Express
 Fort Macleod – Fort Macleod Gazette
 Fort Saskatchewan – Fort Saskatchewan Record, Sturgeon Creek Post, Fort Saskatchewan This Week
 Fox Creek – Fox Creek Times
 Grande Cache – Grande Cache Mountaineer
 Grimshaw – Mile Zero News
 High Level – Echo Pioneer
 High Prairie – South Peace News
 High River – High River Times
 Innisfail – Innisfail Booster
 Jasper – The Fitzhugh
 Lamont – Lamont Leader
 Leduc – Leduc Representative, Leduc & County This Week, Leduc-Wetaskiwin Pipestone Flyer
 Leslieville – The Western Star
 Lethbridge – Lethbridge Sun Times, Cover Story, Lethbridge Journal
 Lloydminster – Lloydminster Meridian Booster, Lloydminster Source
 Magrath – Westwinds Community News
 Manning – Manning Banner Post
 Mayerthorpe – Mayerthorpe Freelancer
 Millet – Leduc-Wetaskiwin Pipestone Flyer
 Morinville – Morinville Free Press, The Morinville News
 Nanton – Nanton News
 Okotoks – Okotoks Western Wheel
 Olds – Olds Albertan, Olds Gazette, Mountain View County News
 Onoway – Lac Ste. Anne Bulletin, Onoway Community Voice
 Oyen – Oyen Echo
 Parkland County – Tri Area News
 Peace River – Peace River Record-Gazette
 Ponoka – Ponoka News, Ponoka Herald
 Provost – Provost News
 Red Deer – Central Alberta Advisor
 Redcliff – 40-Mile County Commentator
 Redwater – Redwater Review, Redwater Tribune
 Rimbey – Rimbey Review
 Rocky Mountain House – Rocky Mountain House Mountaineer
 Rocky View County – Rocky View Weekly
 Rycroft – Rycroft Central Peace Signal
 St. Albert – Saint Albert Gazette, Saint City News
 St. Michael – Elk Island Triangle
 Sedgewick – Sedgewick Community Press
 Sherwood Park – Bugle Publications, Sherwood Park News, Sherwood Park This Week, Strathcona County This Week
 Slave Lake – Lakeside Leader, Slave Lake Scope
 Spruce Grove – Spruce Grove Examiner, Tri Area News
 Standoff – Blood Tribe News
 Stettler – Stettler Independent
 Stony Plain – Stony Plain Reporter, Spruce Grove/Stony Plain This Week, Tri Area News
 Swan Hills – The Grizzly Gazette
 Sylvan Lake – Sylvan Lake News
 Taber – Taber Times
 Three Hills – Three Hills Capital
 Tofield – Tofield Mercury
 Two Hills – Two Hills and County Chronicle, Two Hills Town & Country
 Valleyview – The Valleyview Town & Country
 Vauxhall – Vauxhall Advance
 Vegreville – Vegreville News Advertiser
 Vermilion – Vermilion Voice
 Veteran – Veteran Eagle
 Viking – Viking Weekly Review
 Vulcan – Vulcan Advocate
 Wabamun – Wabamun Community Voice
 Wainwright – Wainwright Review, Wainwright Star Chronicle, Wainwright Edge
 Wetaskiwin – Wetaskiwin Times Advertiser, Leduc-Wetaskiwin Pipestone Flyer
 Whitecourt – Whitecourt Press

British Columbia
 Abbotsford – Abbotsford News, Abbotsford Times
 Agassiz – Agassiz Harrison Observer
 Aldergrove – Aldergrove Star
 Armstrong, British Columbia – Okanagan Advertiser
 Ashcroft/Cache Creek – Ashcroft-Cache Creek Journal
 Barriere – North Thompson Star/Journal
 Bowen Island – Undercurrent
 Burnaby – Burnaby Now
 Burns Lake – Lake District News
 Campbell River – Campbell River Mirror
 Chase/Salmon Arm – Shuswap Market News
 Chilliwack – Chilliwack Progress
 Clearwater – North Thompson Times
 Coquitlam – Coquitlam Now
 Courtenay/Comox – Comox Valley Echo, Comox Valley Record
 Cranbrook – East Kootenay Weekly, Kootenay News Advertiser
 Creston – Creston Valley Advance
 Dawson Creek – Alaska Highway News, The Mirror
 Delta – Delta Optimist, North Delta Sentinel
 Denman Island/Hornby Island – Hornby-Denman Island Grapevine
 Duncan/Cowichan Valley – Cowichan Valley Citizen
 Esquimalt – Esquimalt News
 Fernie – Fernie Free Press
 Fort Nelson – Fort Nelson News
 Fort St. James/Valemount – Caledonia Courier
 Fort St. John – Alaska Highway News, North Peace Express, The Northerner
 Gabriola Island – Gabriola Sounder
 Gibsons – Coast Independent
 Gold River – The Record
 Golden – Golden Star
 Grand Forks – Grand Forks Gazette
 Greenwood – Boundary Creek Times
 Gulf Islands – Island Tides, Gulf Islands Driftwood
 Hagensborg – Coast Mountain News
 Haida Gwaii – Queen Charlotte Islands Observer
 Hope – Hope Standard
 Houston – Houston Today
 Invermere – The Valley Echo
 Kamloops – Kamloops This Week
 Kelowna – Kelowna Capital News
 Keremeos – Gazette of the Similkameen, Keremeos Review
 Kitimat – Northern Sentinel
 Ladysmith – Ladysmith Chronicle
 Lake Country – Lake Country News, The View in Lake Country
 Lake Cowichan – Lake Cowichan Gazette
 Langley – Langley Advance, Langley Times
 Lumby – Lumby Valley Times
 Mackenzie – The Times
 Maple Ridge/Pitt Meadows – Maple Ridge-Pitt Meadows News, Maple Ridge-Pitt Meadows Times
 Merritt – Merrit Herald, Merritt News
 Mission – Mission City Record
 Nakusp – Arrow Lakes News
 Nelson – Kootenay Weekly Express
 New Westminster – New Westminster Record
 North Vancouver – North Shore News
 Oak Bay – Oak Bay News
 Okanagan Falls – Okanagan Falls Review
 100 Mile House – 100 Mile House Free Press
 Osoyoos – Times Chronicle, Desert Connections
 Parksville/Qualicum Beach – The Morning Sun, The Parksville Qualicum News
 Peachland – Peachland View
 Penticton – Penticton Herald
 Port Hardy – Mid Coast Beacon, North Island Gazette
 Powell River – Powell River Peak
 Prince George – Prince George This Week, The Prince George Citizen
 Prince Rupert – Northwest Weekly/Prince Rupert This Week
 Princeton – Similkameen Spotlight
 Quesnel – Quesnel Cariboo Observer
 Revelstoke – Revelstoke Times-Review
 Richmond – Richmond News
 Rossland – Rossland Telegraph
 Saanich – Saanich News
 Salmon Arm – Lakeshore News, Salmon Arm Observer
 Sechelt – Coast Reporter, Kahtou
 Sidney – Peninsula News Review
 Smithers – Interior News
 Sooke – Sooke News Mirror
 Sparwood – Elk Valley Miner, Mountainview Weekly
 Squamish – Squamish Chief
 Sumas/Matsqui (Abbotsford) – Sumas & Matsqui Times
 Summerland – Summerland Review, Summerland/Peachland Bulletin
 Surrey – The Surrey Now News Leader, Indo-Canadian Voice, Cloverdale Reporter
 Terrace – Terrace Standard, Terrace Times
 Tumbler Ridge – Tumbler Ridge Observer
 Ucluelet – The Westerly News
 Valemount – The Rocky Mountain Goat, The Valley Sentinel
 Vancouver – The Georgia Straight
 Vanderhoof – Vanderhoof Omineca Express
 Vernon – The Morning Star
 Victoria – Goldstream News Gazette, Victoria News
 Westbank – Westside Weekly
 Whistler – Whistler Question, Whistler Pique
 Williams Lake – Cariboo Advisor, Williams Lake Tribune
 Zeballos – Zeballos Privateer

Manitoba
 Baldur – The Gazette
 Beausejour – The Clipper Weekly
 Boissevain – The Recorder
 Brandon – Community News
 Brandon – Westman Journal
 Carberry – Carberry News Express
 Dauphin – Dauphin Herald
 Flin Flon – The Reminder
 Gimli – The Express Weekly News
 Minnedosa – The Minnedosa Tribune
 Neepawa – Neepawa Banner, Neepawa Press
 Portage la Prairie – Central Plains Herald-Leader
 Powerview-Pine Falls – Winnipeg River Echo
 Richer – Dawson Trail Dispatch
 Rivers – Rivers Banner
 Russell – The Russell Banner
 St. Boniface – La Liberté
 Selkirk – The Selkirk Record
 Shoal Lake – Crossroads This Week
 Steinbach – Carillon News
 Stonewall – The Stonewall Teulon Tribune
 Swan River – The Star and Times
 The Pas – The Opasquia Times
 Thompson – Nickel Belt News, Thompson Citizen
 Virden – Virden Empire-Advance
 Winnipeg – The Grassroots News, The Winkler Morden Voice
 Winnipeg – Worldwide News, http://www.worldwidenews.ca, Current Affairs & History of National Events of All Countrie

New Brunswick
 Bathurst – L'Étoile Chaleur, Northern Light
 Bouctouche – L'Étoile Kent
 Campbellton – La Voix du Restigouche, The Tribune
 Dieppe – L'Étoile Dieppe
 Grand Bay-Westfield – The River Valley News
 Grand Falls – The Victoria Star
 Miramichi – Miramichi Leader
 Oromocto – Post Gazette
 St. Stephen – Saint Croix Courier
 Shediac – L'Étoile Shediac
 Sussex – Kings County Record
 Woodstock – The Bugle-Observer

Newfoundland and Labrador
 St. John's – The Express, Le Gaboteur

Northwest Territories
 Hay River – The Hub
 Inuvik – Inuvik Drum
 Yellowknife – Yellowknifer, Northwest Territories News/North

Nova Scotia
 Annapolis Royal – The Spectator
 Baddeck – The Victoria Standard
 Bass River – The Shoreline Journal
 Bedford – Bedford-Sackville Observer
 Bridgewater – The Bulletin
 Chester – The Chester Times
 Dartmouth – Dartmouth Tribune
 Digby – The Digby Courier
 Greenwood – The Aurora
 Guysborough – Guysborough Journal
 Halifax – Halifax Citizen
 Inverness – The Inverness Oran
Liverpool – The Advance
 Lunenburg – The Progress Enterprise
 Middleton – The Annapolis County Spectator
 Parrsboro – The Citizen-Record
 Pictou – The Advocate
 Port Hawkesbury – The Reporter
 Shelburne – The Coast Guard
 Springhill – The Record
 Tatamagouche – The Light
 Windsor – The Hants Journal
 Yarmouth – The Sou'Wester, Nova News Now

Nunavut

 Iqaluit – Nunavut News North, Nunatsiaq News

Ontario
 Ajax – Ajax News Advertiser
 Alexandria – Glengarry News
 Alliston – Alliston Herald
 Almonte – Almonte Gazette
 Alvinston – Transcript and Free Press
Amherstburg – River Town Times
 Arnprior – Arnprior Chronicle-Guide, Arnprior Weekender News
 Arthur – Arthur Enterprise News
 Atikokan – Atikokan Progress
 Aurora – Aurora Banner, Auroran
 Aylmer – Aylmer Express
 Ayr – Ayr News
 Bancroft – Bancroft This Week, Bancroft Times and North Hastings Advertiser
 Barrie – Barrie Advance
 Barry's Bay – The Valley Gazette
 Beamsville – Lincoln Post Express
 Beaverton – Brock Citizen
 Beeton – Beeton Record Sentinel
 Belle River – North Essex News
 Bracebridge – Bracebridge Examiner, The Muskokan, Muskoka Sun, Weekender
 Brampton – Brampton Guardian, South Asian Focus
 Brighton – Brighton Gazette, Brighton Independent
 Burk's Falls – Almaguin News
 Burlington – Burlington Post
 Caledon – Caledon Citizen, Caledon Enterprise, The Caledon Underground
 Caledonia – Grand River Sachem
 Cambridge – Cambridge Times
 CFB Trenton – Contact
 Carleton Place – Carleton Place Almonte Canadian Gazette
 Chatham – Chatham This Week, Today's Farmer
 Clarington – Clarington This Week, The Orono Weekly Times
 Clinton – The Clinton News-Record
 Cobourg – Northumberland News
 Cochrane – Cochrane Times-Post
 Colborne – Colborne Chronicle
 Collingwood – Collingwood Connection
 Cornwall – Seaway News, The Seeker
Deep River – North Renfrew Times
 Dresden – Leader-Spirit
 Durham – Durham Chronicle
 Elliot Lake – Elliot Lake Standard
 Elmira – Woolwich Observer
 Erin – Erin Advocate
 Espanola – Mid-North Monitor
 Essex – Essex Voice
 Etobicoke – Etobicoke Guardian
 Exeter – Exeter Times-Advocate
 Fergus – Fergus Elora News Express, Wellington Advertiser
 Fort Frances – Fort Frances Daily Bulletin, Fort Frances Times
 Gananoque – Gananoque Reporter
 Georgina – Georgina Advocate
 Glencoe – Transcript and Free Press
 Goderich – Goderich Signal Star
 Grand Bend – Lakeshore Advance
 Gravenhurst – Gravenhurst Banner
 Grimsby – Grimsby Lincoln Independent
 Guelph – Guelph Mercury Tribune
 Haliburton – Haliburton Echo, The Highlander
 Halton Hills – Independent and Free Press
 Hamilton – Ancaster News, Dundas Star News, Flamborough Review, Glanbrook Gazette, Hamilton Mountain News, Stoney Creek News
 Hanover – Hanover Post
 Huntsville – Huntsville Forester
 Ignace – Driftwood
 Innisfil – Innisfil Scope, Innisfil Journal
 Kawartha Lakes – Kawartha Lakes This Week
 Kemptville – Kemptville Advance
 Kenora – Kenora Miner and News
 Kincardine – Kincardine News
 King – King Sentinel, King Connection
 Kingston – Kingston This Week, Frontenac This Week, Kingstonist, YGK News
 Kitchener – Kitchener Post
 London – The Londoner, London Community News
 Lucknow – Lucknow Sentinel
Manitoulin – Expositor
Markdale – Markdale Standard
 Markham – Markham Economist and Sun
 Midland – Midland Penetanguishene Mirror
 Milton – Milton Canadian Champion
 Minden – Minden Times
 Minto – Minto Express
 Mississauga – Mississauga News, Mississauga This Week, The Booster
 Mitchell – Mitchell Advocate
 Morrisburg – The Morrisburg Leader
 Mount Forest – Mount Forest Confederate
 New Hamburg – New Hamburg Independent
 Newmarket – Newmarket Era
 North Bay – North Bay Nugget
North Huron – North Huron Citizen
 Oakville – Oakville Beaver
 Orangeville – Orangeville Banner
 Orillia – Orillia Today
 Oshawa – Oshawa This Week, Oshawa Express
Oshweken – Turtle Island News
 Ottawa – Nepean This Week, La Nouvelle Étudiant / L'Express Étudiant, Manotick News, UpFront Ottawa
 Parry Sound – Lifestyles This Week, Parry Sound Beacon Star, Parry Sound North Star
 Pembroke – Pembroke News
 Perth – Perth Courier
 Petawawa – Petawawa News
 Peterborough – Peterborough This Week
 Pickering – Pickering News Advertiser
 Port Perry – Scugog Standard, Port Perry Star
 Prince Edward County – Picton Gazette, Picton County Weekly News, Prince Edward Free Press
 Renfrew – Renfrew Mercury
 Richmond Hill – Richmond Hill Liberal
 Sarnia – Sarnia This Week
 Saugeen Shores – Shoreline Beacon
 Sault Ste. Marie – The Sault Star, Sault This Week
 Seaforth – Seaforth Huron Expositor
 Smiths Falls – Smiths Falls Record News
 Springwater – Springwater News
 Stayner – Stayner Sun
 Stirling – Stirling Community Press
 Stouffville – Stouffville Sun-Tribune
 Strathroy – Strathroy Age Dispatch
 Sudbury – Northern Life, Le Voyageur, Sudbury Star
 Tavistock – Tavistock Gazette
 Temiskaming Shores – Temiskaming Speaker
 Thornbury – Thornbury Courier-Herald
 Thornhill – Thornhill Liberal
 Thunder Bay – Thunder Bay Source
Tillsonburg – Norfolk & Tillsonburg News
 Timmins – The Daily Press, Timmins Times, L'Express de Timmins
 Toronto – L'Express (Toronto), Beach and South Riverdale Mirror, Bloor West Villager, City Centre Mirror, East York Mirror, Etobicoke Guardian, The Orono Weekly Times, NOW Magazine, North York Mirror, Parkdale Liberty Villager, Scarborough Mirror, "GTA Weekly", York Commonwealth, York Guardian.
 Tottenham – Tottenham Times
 Trent Hills – Trent Hills Independent
 Trenton – Trenton Trentonian
 Uxbridge – Uxbridge Times Journal, Uxbridge Cosmos, Uxbridge Standard
 Vankleek Hill, Ontario – The Review
 Vaughan – Vaughan Citizen
 Walkerton – Walkerton Herald-Times
 Wallaceburg – Wallaceburg Courier Press, Wallaceburg News
 Wasaga Beach – Wasaga Sun
 Waterloo – Waterloo Chronicle
 West Lorne – West Lorne Chronicle
 Whitby – Whitby This Week
 Wiarton – Wiarton Echo
 Wingham – Wingham Advance Times
 Woodbridge – Woodbridge Advertiser
 Woodstock, Ontario – Woodstock Sentinel-Review

Prince Edward Island
 Alberton – The West Prince Graphic
 Montague – The Eastern Graphic

Quebec
 Alma – Journal le Lac St-Jean
 Amos – Le Citoyen de l'Harricana, Abitibi Express
 Amqui – L'Avant-Poste
 Aylmer – Bulletin d'Aylmer, West Quebec Post
 Baie-Comeau – Plein Jour de Baie-Comeau
 Beauport – Journal Beauport Express
 Beaupré – Journal L'Autre Voix
 Boucherville – Réseau Montérégie, La Relève
 Charlesbourg – Journal Charlesbourg Express
 Châteauguay – Vision
 Chibougamau – La Sentinelle de Chibougamau, Le Jamésien
 Coaticook – Le Progrès de Coaticook
 Cowansville – Le Guide
 Dolbeau-Mistassini – Journal Nouvelles Hebdo
 Drummondville – L'Express
 Eeyou Istchee Territory – The Nation
 Farnham – L'Avenir et des Rivières
 Fort-Coulonge – Pontiac Journal du Pontiac
 Gaspé – Gaspésie Nouvelles, L'Aviron, The Gaspé Spec
 Gatineau – Info07, La Revue, Le Bulletin, L'Étudiant Outaouais
 Granby – Granby Express
 Hudson – Gazette Vaudreuil-Soulanges
 Huntingdon – The Gleaner/La Source
 Joliette – L'Action
 Kahnawake – The Eastern Door
 Knowlton – The Brome County News
 La Sarre – Le Citoyen de l'Abitibi-Ouest
 La Tuque – L'Écho de La Tuque
 Lac-Etchemin – La Voix du Sud
 Lac-Mégantic – L'Écho de Frontenac
 Lachute – Main Street
 Laurier-Station – Le Peuple Lotbinière
 Laval – Courrier Laval The Laval News, The North Shore News
 Lennoxville – The Townships Sun
 Lévis – Le Peuple de Lévis
 Longueuil – Le Courrier Du Sud
 Louiseville – L'Écho de Maskinongé
 Magog – Le Reflet du Lac
 Mirabel – Le Mirabel
 Mont-Joli – L'information Mont-Joli
 Mont-Tremblant – L'Information du Nord Mont-Tremblant, Laurentides Express
 Montmagny – Le Peuple de la Côte-Sud
 Montreal – Parc-Extension News, Nouvelles Saint-Laurent News, Courrier Ahuntsic & Bordeaux-Cartierville, Avenir de l'est, Le Flambeau de l'Est, L'Informateur de Rivière-des-Prairies, Nouvelles Hochelaga-Maisonneuve, Cités Nouvelles, Le Messager Verdun, Progrès Villeray – Parc-Extension, Progrès Saint-Léonard, Guide Montréal-Nord, Journal de Rosemont – La Petite-Patrie, Le Plateau, La Voix Pop, Le Messager LaSalle, Le Messager Lachine & Dorval, Montréal Express, Journal de St-Michel, Le Messager Week-End, Le Magazine Île-des Soeurs, The Chronicle, The Suburban, Les Affaires, Montreal Times, Nuns' Island Magazine, Westmount Independent
 Napierville – Coup d'Oeil
 Nicolet – Le Courrier Sud
 Piedmont – Accès Laurentides
 Port-Cartier – Le Port Cartois
 Quebec City – Quebec Chronicle-Telegraph, Journal de l'habitation, Journal Le Jacques-Cartier, Québec Hebdo, Journal L'Actuel, Journal L'Appel, Journal Le Québec Express
 Repentigny – Hebdo Rive Nord
 Rimouski – Journal L'Avantage
 Rivière-Rouge – L'Information du Nord Vallée de la Rouge
 Roberval – L'Étoile du Lac
 Rouyn-Noranda – La Frontière, Le Citoyen Rouyn-Noranda
 Saguenay – Courrier du Saguenay, Le Quotidien
 Saint-André-Avellin – La Petite-Nation
 Saint-Bruno-de-Montarville – Journal les Versants
 Saint-Eustache – L'Écho de Saint-Eustache, L'Éveil et La Concorde
 Saint-Georges – L'Éclaireur Progrès, Édition Beauce
 Saint-Hubert – Rive-Sud Express
 Saint-Jean-sur-Richelieu – Le Canada Français
 Saint-Jérôme – L'Écho du Nord, Journal Le Nord
 Saint-Lin-Laurentides – L'Express Montcalm
 Saint-Sauveur – Le Journal des Pays-d'en-Haut La Vallée
 Saint-Tite – L'Hebdo Mékinac Des Chenaux
 Sainte-Agathe-des-Monts – L'Information du Nord Sainte-Agathe
 Sainte-Anne-des-Monts – Le Riverain, Point de vue Sainte-Agathe
 Sainte-Thérèse – Nord Info et Voix des Mille-Iles, Journal le Courrier
 Salaberry-de-Valleyfield – Southwest News/Le Suroit
 Sept-Îles – Le Nord-Est
 Shawinigan – L'Hebdo du St-Maurice
 Shawville – The Equity
 Sherbrooke – La Tribune, Le Journal de Sherbrooke, The Townships Outlet
 Terrebonne – Le Trait d'Union
 Thetford Mines – Courrier Frontenac
 Trois-Rivières – L'Hebdo Journal, Le Nouvelliste
 Val-d'Or – Le Citoyen de la Vallée de l'Or, L'Écho Abitibien
 Val-des-Sources – Les Actualités
 Vaudreuil-Dorion – L'Étoile, Your Local Journal
 Victoriaville – La Nouvelle Union
 Wakefield – The Low Down to Hull and Back News

Saskatchewan
 Assiniboia – Assiniboia Times
 Battleford/North Battleford – The Battlefords News Optimist
 Biggar – Biggar Independent
 Bredenbury/Churchbridge/Langenburg/Saltcoats – The Four-Town Journal
 Broadview – Broadview Express
 Canora – Canora Courier
 Carlyle – Carlyle Observer
 Craik – Craik Weekly News
 Creighton – The Northern Visions Gazette
 Davidson – Davidson Leader
 Esterhazy – Esterhazy Miner-Journal
 Estevan – Estevan Mercury, Southeast Trader Express
 Eston/Elrose – Eston-Elrose Press Review
 Foam Lake – Foam Lake Review
 Fort Qu'Appelle – Fort Qu'Appelle Times
 Gravelbourg – Gravelbourg Tribune
 Grenfell – Grenfell Sun
 Gull Lake – Gull Lake Advance
 Herbert – Herbert Herald
 Humboldt – Humboldt Journal
 Indian Head/Wolseley – Indian Head-Wolseley News
 Ituna – Ituna News
 Kamsack – Kamsack Times
 Kelvington – Kelvington Radio, Northeast Chronicle
 Kerrobert – Kerrobert Citizen
 Kindersley – Kindersley Clarion
 Kinistino/Birch Hills – Kinistino-Birch Hills Post-Gazette
 Lanigan – Lanigan Advisor
 Leader – Leader News
 Lloydminster – Lloydminster Meridian Booster, Lloydminster Source
 Macklin – Macklin Mirror
 Maidstone – Maidstone Mirror
 Maple Creek – Maple Creek and Southwest Advance Times, Maple Creek News
 Meadow Lake – Meadow Lake Northern Pride
 Melfort – Melfort Journal
 Melville – Melville Advance
 Moosomin – Moosomin World-Spectator
 Naicam – Naicam News
 Nipawin – Nipawin Journal
 Norquay – Norquay North Star
 Outlook – The Outlook
 Preeceville – The Preeceville Progress
 Prince Albert – Rural Roots Prince Albert Daily Herald
 Radville – Radville Star, Deep South Star
 Regina – Regina Sun
 Rosetown – Rosetown Eagle
 Rosthern – Saskatchewan Valley News
 St. Walburg – St. Walburg & Area Gazette
 Saskatoon – Saskatoon Bridges
 Shaunavon – Shaunavon Standard
 Shellbrook – Shellbrook Chronicle
 Strasbourg – Last Mountain Times
 Swift Current – The Prairie Post, The Southwest Booster
 Tisdale – The Parkland Review, Tisdale Recorder
 Turtleford – Northwest Neighbors
 Unity – Northwest Herald
 Wadena – Wadena News
 Wakaw/Cudworth – Wakaw Recorder & Cudworth Progress
 Warman – The Country Press
 Watrous – Watrous Manitou
 Watson – East Central Connection
 Weyburn – Weyburn Review, Weyburn This Week
 Whitewood – Whitewood Herald
 Wilkie – Wilkie Press
 Wolseley – Wolseley Bulletin
 Wynyard – Advance Gazette
 Yorkton – Yorkton This Week

Alternative weeklies

British Columbia
 Vancouver – Georgia Straight
 Victoria – Monday Magazine

Manitoba
 Winnipeg – Uptown

Newfoundland and Labrador
 St. John's – The Scope

Nova Scotia
 Halifax – The Coast
 Annapolis Valley – The Grapevine

Ontario
 Hamilton – View Magazine

Prince Edward Island
 Charlottetown – The Buzz

Quebec
 Montreal – Voir

Saskatchewan
 Regina – Prairie Dog

Ethnic and multicultural newspapers

Afghani 
 Toronto – Afghan Post

Arabic
London, Ontario – Al Bilad, Al Falqa
Mississauga, Ontario – Alwatan-Arabic-Canadian-Newspaper-صحيفة-الوطن-كندا-776012402431276/ Al-Wattan
Mississauga, Ontario – Al-Mersa, Al Muhajer (The Migrant, Arabic, English, French)
Montreal – Al Akhbar, Al-Ayam Al Arabia (الايام العربية) (Arabic), Al Awsat, Al Hadath, Al Mustakbal, Al Machreq et Al-Maghreb (Arabic, French), Atlas.Mtl (French), El Mahrousa, El Masri, Founoun, Phoenicia (Arabic, French, English, Armenian), Sada al Mashrek (Arabic, French, English), Shlomeel - Salam Allah (Arabic, French, English)
Ottawa – Arab Canada Newspaper (Arabic)
Toronto –  Hashtag Arabia (hashtag, Arabic, English)
Toronto – Al-Ahram Elgdeed
Vancouver – Muslim Community Journal

Armenian
 Montreal – Abaka (Armenian, French, English), Horizon Weekly (Armenian, French, English)

Bengali
Montreal – International Dhaka Post (Bengali, English)
 Toronto – The Bangla Kagoj, Bengali Time, The Deshe Bideshe (Bengali, English), Notundesh Canada

Bulgarian
 Montreal – Forum Bulgare

Caribbean
 Montreal – Montreal Community Contact
 Toronto – The GTA Times, The GTA Times Inc., Toronto Caribbean Newspaper, Vision Newspaper Canada

Chinese
 Calgary – Canadian Chinese Times (Chinese: 加华报)
Edmonton – Edmonton Chinese News (Chinese: 愛華報)
 Hamilton, Ontario – Hamilton Chinese News
 London, Ontario – London Chinese Post
 Mississauga, Ontario – Mississauga Chinese News
 Montreal – The Chinese News (Chinese: 华侨新报), Luby Chinese Weekly (Chinese: 路比華訊), Sept Days (Chinese: 七天), Sino Quebec, Today Commercial News]
 Ottawa, Ontario – Capital Chinese News, Canada Chinese News, The Ottawa Weekend
 Toronto – Canada China News; Chinese: 中华导报), Ming Pao Daily News, Today Daily News
 Vancouver – Asian Pacific Post, Dawa Business Press (Chinese: 大华商报), Global Chinese Press (Chinese: 环球华报), Health Times (Chinese: 健康时报), Ming Pao Daily News, Voice Richmond Weekly
 Winnipeg – Manitoba China Times, Winnipeg Chinese Post (Chinese: 温尼伯华商报)

Dutch
 Oakville, Ontario – Maandblad de Krant

Farsi
 Montreal – Hafteh (Persian هفته)
 Montreal – MEDAD (Persian مداد)
 Toronto – Atash (Persian آتش)
 Vancouver – Paivand (Persian پیوند)
 Vancouver – Shahrvand (Persian پیوند)

Filipino 
 Montreal – Filipino Star
 Toronto – Daily South Asian Free Press, Diaryo Alberta, Filipiniana, Philippine Reporter, South Asian Star
 Vancouver – The Filipino Post, Philippine Asian Chronicles, Philippine Canadian Inquirer
 Winnipeg – Ang Peryodiko, The Filipino Journal, The Philippine Times

Finnish
 Thunder Bay, Ontario – Canadan Sanomat
Toronto – Canadan Uutiset, Kanadan Sanomat
Vancouver – Länsirannikon Uutiset

German
 Calgary – Mill Woods Mosaic
 Edmonton – The Albertaner
 Montreal – Das Echo
 Ottawa – The Hofbräuhaus News
 Steinbach, Manitoba – Das Blatt, Die Mennonitische Post
Toronto – Das Journal, Deutsche Presse, Deutsche Rundschau, Echo Germanica, Neue Welt

Greek
 Montreal – Ta Ellinikacanadika Nea, The Montreal Greek Times, Vima (Greek, English, French), The Greek Press
 Toronto – Balita, he Greek Pres (Greek: Ελληνικός Τύπος)
 Vancouver – Gnome

Gujarati 
 Toronto – Gujarat Abroad, Gujarat Newsline, Gujarat Weekly, Swadesh

Hebrew/Jewish
 Montreal – The Moment
 Ottawa – Ottawa Jewish Bulletin (Hebrew, English)
 Toronto – Shalom Toronto

Hindi
 Montreal – Bharat Times
 Toronto – Asian Connections, Asian Tribune, Ask Me Biz, Can-India News, Canadian Asian News, Delhi News Record, Diversity Reporter, Hindi Abroad, India Calling, Indian Express Canada, Journal India, The South Asian News, South Asian Weekender, Weekly Voice (English)
 Vancouver – Apna Roots, Asian Journal, Asian Pacific Post, The Asian Star, 'Hindi Journal, The Indo-Canadian Voice, The Link, The South Asian Post

Icelandic
 Winnipeg – Lögberg-Heimskringla

Italian
 Montreal – Corriere Italiano, Il Cittadino Canadese
 Ottawa – Il Postino, L'Ora di Ottawa
 Toronto – Corriere Canadese

Japanese
 Vancouver – Vancouver Shinpo* Toronto – Nikka Times, Nikkei Voice

Korean
 Toronto – The Korea Times Daily
 Vancouver – Canada Express Korean, Vanchosun.

Nepali 
 Toronto – Canada Nepal

Polish 
Vancouver – Takie Życie

Portuguese
 Montreal – A Voz de Portugal, Lusopresse
 Toronto – ABC Portuguese Canadian, Além-Fronteiras, Milénio Stadium, North News, Nove Ilhas, Portuguese Post, Sol Português, Voice Portuguese-Canadian Newspaper
 Winnipeg – O Mundial

Punjabi
Edmonton – Nawi Dunia
 Calgary – Des Punjab Times (Punjabi and English)
Toronto – Ajit Weekly, Canadian Punjabi Post (Punjabi), Khabarnama Punjabi Weekly, Punjab Star, Awaaz Punjabi
Montreal – Desi Times (Punjabi and English)
Vancouver – Akai Guardian, Canadian Punjab Times (Punjabi), Charhdi Kala, Indo-Canadian Times, The Patrika, Punjab Di Awaaz, Punjabi Journal

Romanian
 Hamilton, Ontario – Agenda Romaneasca
 Montreal – Accent Montreal, Pagini Romanesti, Zig-Zag Roman-Canadian
 Toronto – Acasa, Faptu' Divers

Russian
 Montreal – Monrealskaya Gazeta Zapad-Vostok, Nasha Gazeta Montreal (The Voice of Community, (Russian: ГОЛОС ОБЩИНЫ)
 Toronto – Nasha Canada - Наша Канада

Serbian
 Toronto - Glas Kanadskih Srba (Voice of Canadian Serbs)

Sinhala 
 Toronto – Sri Lankan Anchorman, The Sri Lanka Reporter

Spanish
Calgary – Canadian Latino Newspaper
 Hamilton, Ontario – Presencia Latina
 Montreal – L'Alternativa Latina, El Chasqui Latino, Journal Comercio Latino, Noticias Montreal
 Ottawa – Eco Latino
 Toronto – Correo Canadiense, El Popular, La Jornada, La Portada Canadá, La Voz Latina, El Centro News, Toronto Dominicano
 Vancouver – La Re – Vista

Swedish 
 Vancouver – Nya Svenska Presse

Tamil 
 Toronto – Amalai Express, Canada Uthayan, Dasatha, Free Voice Media Creations, Thangatheepam News, The Times of Sri Lanka

Turkish
 Montreal – Bizim Anadolu (Turkish, English, French)
 Toronto – Canadatürk (Turkish, English)

Ukrainian
 Toronto – New Pathway: Ukrainian Weekly Newspaper (Ukrainian: Новий Шлях: Український Тижневик)
 Winnipeg – The Ukrainian Voice (Ukrainian: Український Голос)

Urdu 
 Calgary – The Canadian Times, Weekly Canada Express
 Montreal – Nawai Pakistan
 Toronto – Eastern News, Sunday Times, Urdu Post Canada
 Vancouver – Urdu Journal

Vietnamese
 Calgary –Việt Nam Thời Báo
 Montreal – Tuần Tin Montréal, Việt Báo
 Toronto –Thời Báo
 Vancouver – Thoi Su, Tự Do

Religious newspapers

 Edmonton, Alberta – Living Light News (Christian)

Monthly newspapers
 L'Action nationale
 L'aut'journal
 L'initiative
 Cult MTL
 Electric City Magazine – Peterborough, Ontario
 The Dawson Trail Dispatch – SE Manitoba
 The Hudson Bay Post – Churchill, Manitoba
 People's Voice
 Le Québécois
 Scene
 Windsor Independent

Student newspapers

Alberta
 Athabasca University – The Voice Magazine
 Lethbridge College – The Endeavour
 MacEwan University – The Griff
 Mount Royal University – The Reflector
 Northern Alberta Institute of Technology – The Nugget
 Southern Alberta Institute of Technology – The Weal, Polytechnic Press
 University of Alberta – The Gatewa, The Dagligtale
 University of Calgary – The Gauntlet
 University of Lethbridge – The Meliorist

British Columbia
 British Columbia Institute of Technology – The Link
 Camosun College – The Nexus
 Capilano University – The Capilano Courier
 Douglas College – The Other Press
 Emily Carr University of Art and Design – Woo Magazine
 Kwantlen Polytechnic University – The Runner
 Langara College – The Voice
 Quest University – The Spit
 Selkirk College – The Sentinel
 Simon Fraser University – The Peak
 Thompson Rivers University – The Omega
 Trinity Western University – Mars' Hill
 University of British Columbia – The Ubyssey
 University of British Columbia Okanagan – The Phoenix
 University of the Fraser Valley – The Cascade
 University of Northern British Columbia – Over the Edge
 University of Victoria – The Martlet
 Vancouver Island University – The Navigator

Manitoba
 Brandon University – The Quill
 Canadian Mennonite University – The Doxa
 Red River College – The Projector
 St. Paul's College – The Paulinian
 Université de Saint-Boniface – Le Réveil
 University of Manitoba – The Manitoban
 University of Winnipeg – The Uniter

New Brunswick
 Mount Allison University – The Argosy
 St. Thomas University – The Aquinian
 Université de Moncton – Le Front
 University of New Brunswick – The Brunswickan (Fredericton campus), The Baron (Saint John campus)

Newfoundland and Labrador
 Memorial University of Newfoundland – The Muse

Nova Scotia
 Acadia University – The Athenaeum
 Cape Breton University – The Caper Times
 Dalhousie University – The Dalhousie Gazette
 Mount Saint Vincent University – The Sentinel
 Nova Scotia Agricultural College – Golden Ram
 Saint Francis Xavier University – The Xaverian Weekly
 Saint Mary's University – The Journal
 University of King's College – The Watch

Ontario
 Algoma University – The Sentient
 Algonquin College – Algonquin Times
 Brock University – The Brock Press
 Carleton University – The Charlatan
 Centennial College – The Centennial College Courier
 Conestoga College – The Spoke
 Durham College – The Chronicle
 Fanshawe College – The Interrobang
 George Brown College – The Dialog
 Humber College – Humber Etcetera
 Lakehead University – The Argus
 Laurentian University – Lambda (English), L'Orignal déchaîné (French)
 Loyalist College – The Pioneer
 McMaster University – The Silhouette
 Mohawk College – Ignite News
 Niagara College – Niagara News
 Nipissing University – Student Spotlight, Campus Free Press
 OCAD University – Cadmium
 Queen's University at Kingston – The Queen's Journal, Golden Words
 Redeemer University College – The Crown
 Royal Military College of Canada – The Precision
 St. Clair College – The Saint
 Seneca College – The Buzz
 Sheridan College – Sheridan Sun
 Toronto  Metropolitan University – The Eyeopener, On the Record
 Trent University – Arthur, The Absynthe
 University of Guelph – The Ontarion
 University of Ontario Institute of Technology – Chronicle
 University of Ottawa – Fulcrum (English), La Rotonde (French)
 University of Toronto – The Newspaper, The Varsity
Innis College – Innis Herald
 St. Michael's College – The Mike
 Trinity College – Salterrae
 University College – The Gargoyle
 Victoria University – The Strand
 University of Toronto Mississauga – The Medium
 University of Toronto Scarborough – The Underground
 University of Waterloo – Imprint
 University of Western Ontario – The Gazette
 University of Windsor – The Lance
 Wilfrid Laurier University – The Cord, The Sputnik
 York University – Excalibur
 Glendon College – Pro Tem
 McLaughlin College – MacMedia
 Osgoode Hall – Obiter Dicta

Prince Edward Island
 Holland College – The Surveyor
 University of Prince Edward Island – The Cadre

Quebec
 Bishop's University – The Campus
 Cégep de Jonquière – La Pige
 Cégep du Vieux Montréal – Le Bagou, L'ultimatum, Le p'tit vieux
 Cégep régional de Lanaudière (Joliette campus) – Le Détour
 Concordia University – The Link (English), The Concordian (English), L'Organe (French)
 Dawson College – The Plant
 École Polytechnique de Montréal – Le Polyscope
 HEC Montréal – L’intérêt
 John Abbott College – Bandersnatch
 McGill University – The McGill Daily, McGill Tribune, The Bull & Bear, Le Délit français (French)
 MRC des Laurentides – Mainstreet
 Téluq – Sans Papier
 Université de Montréal – , Forum
 Université de Sherbrooke – Le Collectif
 Université du Québec à Chicoutimi – Le Griffonnier
 Université du Québec à Montréal – Montréal Campus
 Université du Québec à Trois-Rivières – Entête
 Université Laval – Impact Campus, La Marmite sociale, Le Fil des évènements

Saskatchewan
 University of Regina – The Carillon
 University of Saskatchewan – The Sheaf

See also
 History of Canadian newspapers
 List of editors-in-chief of the largest newspapers in Canada
 List of Indigenous periodicals in Canada
 List of newspapers in Canada by circulation
 List of student newspapers in Canada
 List of defunct newspapers of Canada
 Media in Toronto

References

External links
 Canadian Newspaper List
 Canada Newspapers
 Canadian Newspaper Association

 
Newspapers